The Lincolnshire Senior Shield is a County Cup competition for teams in Lincolnshire who are in steps 2-4 of the non league pyramid. The current champions are Stamford who won it for the fourth time this year. Stamford are the most successful team in the competition, winning it four times.

Previous Winners

Results by team

County Cup competitions
2006 establishments in England